This is a list of architecture schools in Bangladesh.

Institutes
 Housing & Building Research Institute
 Institute of Architects Bangladesh

Public schools
 Bangabandhu Sheikh Mujibur Rahman Science and Technology University Department of Architecture, Gopalganj
 Bangladesh University of Engineering & Technology, Department of Architecture, Faculty of Architecture and Planning, Dhaka Estd. 1961
 Chittagong University of Engineering and Technology, Department of Architecture, Faculty of Architecture & Planning, Chittagong Estd. 2009
 Dhaka University of Engineering & Technology, Gazipur Department of Architecture, Dhaka
 Hajee Mohammad Danesh Science & Technology University Department of Architecture, Dinajpur
 Khulna University of Engineering & Technology, Department of Architecture, Faculty of Architecture & Planning Khulna
 Khulna University, Discipline of Architecture, School of Science, Engineering & Technology, Khulna Estd. 1991
 Military Institute of Science and Technology, Department of Architecture, Dhaka Estd. 2015
 Pabna University of Science & Technology, Department of Architecture, Pabna
 Rajshahi University of Engineering and Technology, Department of Architecture, Rajshahi
 Shahjalal University of Science and Technology, Department of Architecture, School of Applied Sciences & Technology, Sylhet Estd. 2002

Private schools
 Primeasia University, Department of Architecture, Dhaka
 BRAC University, Department of Architecture, Dhaka
 American International University Bangladesh, Department of Architecture, Dhaka
 Bangladesh University, Department of Architecture, Dhaka
 Daffodil International University, Department of Architecture, Dhaka
 Leading University, Department of Architecture, Sylhet
 North South University, Department of Architecture, Dhaka
 Premier University, Chittagong, Department of Architecture, Chittagong
 Ahsanullah University of Science and Technology, Department of Architecture, Dhaka
 Shanto-Mariam University of Creative Technology, Department of Architecture, Dhaka
 Sonargaon University, Department of Architecture, Dhaka
 Southeast University, Department of Architecture, Dhaka
 Stamford University, Department of Architecture, Dhaka
 State University of Bangladesh, Department of Architecture, Dhaka
 University of Asia Pacific, Department of Architecture, Dhaka

References

Architecture schools
Bangladesh
List